Edmund James Bradbury (born 10 September 1992) is a British cyclist, who rides for British amateur team Sigma Sports–Cannondale RT.

Major results
Source: 

2015
 2nd Time trial, National Road Championships
2019
 1st  Mountains classification Tour of Xingtai
 2nd Overall Tour du Maroc
 7th Overall Tour de Taiwan

References

External links

1992 births
Living people
British male cyclists
English male cyclists
People from Surrey
Alumni of the University of Cambridge